Group C of the 1997 Fed Cup Europe/Africa Zone Group II was one of four pools in the Europe/Africa zone of the 1996 Fed Cup. Six teams competed in a round robin competition, with the top team advancing to Group I for 1998.

Portugal vs. Ethiopia

Turkey vs. San Marino

Bosnia and Herzegovina vs. Norway

Portugal vs. Norway

Turkey vs. Bosnia and Herzegovina

San Marino vs. Ethiopia

Portugal vs. Bosnia and Herzegovina

Turkey vs. Ethiopia

Norway vs. San Marino

Portugal vs. San Marino

Turkey vs. Norway

Bosnia and Herzegovina vs. Ethiopia

Bosnia and Herzegovina vs. San Marino

Norway vs. Ethiopia

Portugal vs. Turkey

  placed first in the pool, and thus advanced to Group I in 1998, where they placed second in their group of four.

See also
Fed Cup structure

References

External links
 Fed Cup website

1997 Fed Cup Europe/Africa Zone